is a Japanese female volleyball player.

She was part of the Japan women's national volleyball team, at the 2005 FIVB Women's World Grand Champions Cup, and the 2006 FIVB Volleyball World Grand Prix.

Career 
She played for Tohoku Fukushi University.
On club level she played for Hitachi Sawa Rivale in 2006.

References

External links 
 

Living people
1973 births
Japanese women's volleyball players